Mahitsy is  rural municipality in Analamanga Region, in the  Central Highlands of Madagascar. In the 2001 census, it had a population of 26,056.

Mahitsy is localized at the RN 4 from Antananrivo to Mahajanga.

Economy
About 40% of the eggs consumed in Madagascar are from farms of the surroundings of Mahitsy.

Projects
There is an ongoing project of a hydroelectric power plant near Mahitsy on the Farahantsana river.

References

Populated places in Analamanga